Smolensk is a Polish drama thriller film directed by director Antoni Krauze released in September of 2016.

Storyline 
Polish reporter of television TVM-SAT Nina (Beata Fido) lead the investigation of the air disaster in Smolensk. From the beginning Nina, like her boss, is skeptical about the theory of assassination, but  time, she changes her opinion.

Cast 

 Beata Fido as Nina
 Redbad Klijnstra as Editor in Chief of television TVM-SAT.
 Halina Łabonarska as Nina's mother.
 Lech Łotocki as President  RP Lech Kaczyński.
 Ewa Dałkowska as First lady of Poland Maria Kaczyńska.
 Maciej Góraj as Nina's father.
 Aldona Struzik as Ewa Błasik, wife of General Andrzej Błasik.
 Maciej Brzoska as Chef of  Tu-154.
 Marek Bukowski as pilot in the bar.

Controversies 
Leading actors in Poland refused to be involved in the film's production for questioning the official government explanation of the crash. Director Krauze reported that his viewpoint around the crash had cost millions of dollars in lost financing from the government.

References

External links
 

Films shot in Warsaw
Films shot in Kraków
Films scored by Michał Lorenc
Smolensk air disaster
Films about mass media people
Films about aviation accidents or incidents
Films set in the 21st century